Michael Robertson is an American college baseball coach, currently serving as head coach of the Texas Southern team. He was previously the head coach at Prairie View A&M University.

Head coaching record

See also
 List of current NCAA Division I baseball coaches

References

Living people
High school baseball coaches in the United States
Prairie View A&M Panthers baseball coaches
Texas Southern Tigers baseball coaches
Year of birth missing (living people)
Prairie View A&M University alumni
African-American baseball coaches
Forest Brook High School alumni
Baseball coaches from Texas
Sportspeople from Houston
Huston–Tillotson Rams baseball players